Alan Olav Walker (born 24 August 1997) is a British-Norwegian music producer and DJ primarily known for the critically acclaimed single "Faded" (2015), which was certified platinum in 14 countries. He has also made several songs including  "Sing Me to Sleep", "Alone", "Darkside", and "On My Way", all of which attracted millions of views on YouTube.

In early 2017, Walker's channel emerged as the most subscribed YouTube channel registered in Norway, with 6 million subscribers. As of March 2023, his channel is still most subscribed in Norway, achieving 43 million subscribers on march 11th of 2023. He also has the most views of any Norwegian creator, with approximately 12.1 billion views as of 21 January 2023.

Early life 
Alan Olav Walker was born on 24 August 1997 in Northampton, England, to Anglo-Scottish British Philip Alan Walker, and his Norwegian wife Hilde Omdal Walker. As a result, by his international parental inheritance, he was granted dual citizenship from both the United Kingdom and Norway.

He grew up with two siblings, an elder sister named Camilla, who was also born in England; and a younger brother named Andreas, who was born in Norway. At the age of two, he and his family moved to Bergen. Walker later found interest in computers, a hobby which has driven him deeper to computing graphical design, and musical programming. He initially had no musical background, but was able to teach himself by watching YouTube tutorials based on musical production.

Career

2012–2016: Career beginnings and breakthrough 
In 2012, Walker was listening to a song by Italian DJ David Whistle (also known as DJ Ness) and reached out to him to find out how he produced his music. He was inspired by EDM producers K-391 and Ahrix, and by film composers like Hans Zimmer and Steve Jablonsky. He started producing his music on his laptop using FL Studio. In July 2012, with the help and feedback from his fans online, he began pursuing his music production career and slowly began posting his music to YouTube and SoundCloud. Starting as a bedroom producer, he was better known as DJ Walkzz before signing a record deal and releasing his debut single in 2014.

Walker released the track "Fade" on 17 August 2014. The track gained attention after its re-release via the record label NoCopyrightSounds on 19 November 2014. Walker stated that the creation of the track was inspired by K-391 and Ahrix, whose tracks were also picked up by the record label. The track has over 400 million views on YouTube, 115 million plays on Spotify, and 41 million streams on SoundCloud. The tracks "Spectre" and "Force" followed in 2015.

Walker signed with MER Musikk under Sony Music Sweden and released his next single, "Faded", a remastered vocal version of "Fade". It was released on 8 December 2015 and featured uncredited Naustdal pop singer Iselin Solheim. The single topped the year-end charts in Austria, Germany, Switzerland and Sweden, iTunes charts in 33 countries, as well as entering top 10 in Spotify Global Chart. The music video on YouTube has over 3.4 billion views and 26 million likes, placing it among the top 10 most-liked YouTube videos. It has over 1.7 billion plays on Spotify, and is also one of the Top 10 Most Shazamed tracks of 2016. The single also received official remixes from Tiësto, Dash Berlin, and Hardwell. He later released an acoustic "restrung" version of the song, with all the EDM elements taken out.

Walker quit high school in January to pursue his music career. On 27 February, Walker made his performance debut at the Winter X Games in Oslo, where he performed 15 tracks including the song "Faded" together with Iselin Solheim. By March, Walker had produced 30 to 40 songs in total, but "Faded" marks his first single with Sony Music Sweden, and the first to achieve such global success. On 7 April, Walker teamed up with Zara Larsson at the Echo Awards in Germany. Together they performed each other's songs "Faded" and "Never Forget You". Four weeks previously, he achieved the first place on NRJ Euro Hot 30 for the first time, which only has been achieved by one other Norwegian artist, Kygo.

The single "Sing Me to Sleep" was released on 3 June, featuring female vocalist Iselin Solheim, the same vocalist as in "Faded". The song topped iTunes charts in 7 countries. Its music video on YouTube has over 570 million views, and it also reached 250 million plays on Spotify. Another single titled "Alone" was also released on 2 December of that same year, incoperating uncredited Swedish singer Noonie Bao. The music video on YouTube has over 1 billion views, the track also gained over 390 million plays on Spotify. The song was described as "the final piece of a trilogy consisting of 'Faded', 'Sing Me To Sleep' and 'Alone'" by Gunnar Greeve, Walker's manager and co-writer for the single.

On 21 and 22 December, Walker held the concert "Alan Walker is Heading Home" in his hometown Bergen at USF Verftet, where he performed 16 songs and tracks together with Angelina Jordan, Marius Samuelsen, Alexandra Rotan, Yosef Wolde-Mariam, and Tove Styrke as singers. The concert was officially live-streamed on YouTube. He premiered several unreleased tracks, including a restrung version of "Sing Me to Sleep", as well as "Heading Home", the latter of which was first performed during his debut at Winter X Games. The song "The Spectre", a remastered version of his earlier track "Spectre", was also performed during the concert.

On 23 December, Walker released the video for the single "Routine", which premiered on his concert in Bergen two days earlier and on some concerts on the "Walker Tour". The track was made in collaboration with David Whistle. Its music video on YouTube has over 58 million views, and 47 million plays on Spotify.

2017–present: Different World, World of Walker and other projects 
At the beginning of 2017, Walker's YouTube channel became the most subscribed channel registered in Norway, after passing about 4.5 million subscribers, and had the most views among Norwegian YouTubers at around 7.7 billion views as of 25 January 2020. Between February and April, he toured around America including attending the Euphoria Festival in Texas. In 2019, Alan's music video ''Diamond Heart'' received a nomination for Best Cinematography at the Berlin Music Video Awards. His music video for ''Heading Home'' featuring Ruben appears on the festival's 2021 Silver Screenings selection list.

On 26 November 2021, Alan Walker released his second studio album titled "World of Walker", which consists of 15 tracks, primarily made in electropop and EDM. In 2022, he announced his new Walkerverse world tour, alongside his upcoming album of the same name that will be released in two parts. The first part was released on June 17, 2022, which consists of five tracks: a remix of "Adventure Time", originally written and produced by Philter, "Somebody Like U" with Au/Ra, "Blue" with Ina Wroldsen, and previously-released songs "The Drum" featuring uncredited vocals by Kristin Carpenter and "Hello World" with Torine. The second part, "Walkerverse, Pt. 2" as of yet contains five songs: "Extremes" with Trevor Daniel, "Shut Up" with UPSAHL, "Catch me if you can" with Sorana, "Lovesick" with Sophie Simmons, and "Ritual".

In late 2021, Walker's contract with NoCopyrightSounds expired, meaning that his releases on the label (namely Fade, Spectre and Force) were taken off of NoCopyrightSounds' catalogue and from streaming platforms. The songs would then be redistributed in July of 2022, as part of his deal with Corite.

In 2023, Walker signed with the Swedish website Corite, which allows fans to invest in a project with returns of 1.4 to 1.7 times the initial investment. Walker has already raised over $100,000 from fans for his next musical product. Walker already has two songs on the platform, the first called Origins and the second, a project with The Walkers, called Unity.

Artistic image 
Walker was originally known as "DJ Walkzz" or "Walkzz" when he started out. He ended up using his real name, Alan Walker, as his artist name after signing up with a record label. He designed his logo in 2013, a symbol consisting of intertwined letters "A" and "W" which are the initials of his name. He uses a hoodie and face mask when he performs on stage. When asked why he uses a mask during an interview with Norwegian public broadcaster NRK, he stated that "It is to keep a low profile while maintaining the mental image they have given me. I think it's pretty cool. A little twist that makes people ask themselves questions about who really is the person behind Alan Walker." On an episode of his Unmasked series, he stated that "The mask is more of a sign and a symbol of unity and being alike each other, rather than me being different."

Reception 
Alan Walker has generally been well-received by critics. His music has been praised for its creative production, unique style, and melodic sound. Critics have also noted the strong emotional impact of his music. However, many have criticized Alan Walker's music for being too repetitive and lacking in lyrical content. Other critics have been divided on his use of vocal samples, with some praising it for adding an extra layer of emotion to his music while others have argued that it detracts from the overall appeal of the music. Additionally, Walker received criticism from a "walkthrough" video on the production of his song "Alone", via the YouTube channel Future Music Magazine. Due to his co-producer Mood Melodies's extensive involvement in the production of the song, the video was met with backlash from many of Walker's fans, who considered Mood Melodies as his "ghost-producer".

Julie Bergan replacement 
In 2022, Alan Walker created a song titled "Ritual" which had been played numerous times on his performances before release on November 2022, the same date as he released "Walkerverse. pt. II", an EP the song originally was part of. The song ended up being released as a single due to issues. Julie Bergan, a Norwegian singer-songwriter Walker collaborated with, before was allegedly part of the song's creation as she accompanied Walker as a singer for the song noticeably on performances. The song featuring her voice was frequently used in teasers for the second part of the Walkerverse album, but they were ultimately unused in the final song. 

Upon release, many fans were critical of the new singer and deemed her vocals inferior to Bergan's. Bergan's manager Cecile Torp-Holte stated that there was no agreement between her and MER on using Bergan's vocals. According to Torp-Holte, six concerts were planned in the US where Bergan was to perform with Walker, including a performance of "Ritual" as part of a larger agreement. She also said that the song's original release date was October 28, and the negotiations on sharing rights collapsed shortly before.

Discography 

 Different World (2018)
 World of Walker (2021)

Tour 
Headlining
 Walker Tour (2016–2018)
 World of Walker Tour (2018)
 Different World Tour (2018–2019)
 Aviation Tour (2019)
 Walkerverse (2022)

Supporting
 Rihanna – Anti World Tour (2016)
 Justin Bieber – Purpose World Tour (2017)
 Martin Garrix – Thursdays at Ushuaïa

Accolades 

Walker was nominated for a wide variety of accolades. He won most of them including Årets Musikk Music of the Year from Gullsnutten; Best Norwegian Act at MTV Europe Music Awards, European Border Breakers Award and Public Choice Award from EBBA Awards '17; Best New Talent at WDM Radio Awards and Swiss Music Awards; Eksportprisen '16, The Export Prize '16 at Spellemannprisen and Music Norway; Best Norwegian Act from MTV Europe Music Awards; Best Breakthrough Artist as awarded by International Dance Music Awards; Best Norwegian Act by MTV Europe Music Awards; as well as Årets Spellemann Spellemann of the Year from Spellemannprisen '18. His song, "Faded" was awarded The Cannes Lions Award at Cannes Lions International Festival of Creativity, Best International Hit from Eska Music Awards, and Spellemannprisen '16's Årets Låt Song of the Year, and the Best Western Artist of the Year. At the NRJ Music Awards Norge, the song "Sing Me to Sleep" won the Årets Norske Låt Norwegian Song of the Year.

References 

 
 
 

Alan Walker (music producer)
1997 births
People from Northampton
English emigrants to Norway
English people of Norwegian descent
English record producers
Deep house musicians
21st-century Norwegian male musicians
Electronic dance music DJs
Electro house musicians
Musicians from Bergen
Living people
Norwegian record producers
YouTube channels launched in 2012
Norwegian DJs
Norwegian YouTubers
Progressive house musicians
Remixers
Masked musicians
MTV Europe Music Award winners
Music-related YouTube channels
Music YouTubers
NoCopyrightSounds artists
YouTube vloggers
FL Studio users
Spanish-language singers of Norway
RCA Records artists
Sony Music artists
Ultra Records artists